Mr. Eliminator is the fourth studio album of surf music by surf pioneer Dick Dale (and his Del-Tones), released in 1964 as a loose conceptual successor to the previous album Checkered Flag. This album consists mostly of hot-rod or racing themes, whether simply in the names, or in the slight alteration of beats and accompaniment as well, as was seen in the Checkered Flag album. Dale is widely known and famous for incorporating heavy middle-eastern influence into his recordings, and some may argue that "The Victor", a track on the album, as being probably the heaviest in influence. This album was Dale's last venture into the hot-rod style of surf music, and with his next album (and last studio album with the Del-Tones), Summer Surf, he would return to the "regular" style of surf music.

Track listing
All tracks composed by Dick Dale; except where indicated
 "Mr. Eliminator"
 "50 Miles to Go" (Kenny Young)
 "Flashing Eyes"
 "Taco Wagon"
 "The Squirrel" (Carol Connors, Steve Barri)
 "The Victor"
 "Blond in the 406" (Carol Connors, Steve Barri, Steven Gorman)
 "Firing Up"
 "My X-KE" (Carol Connors, Steve Barri, Steven Gorman)
 "Nitro Fuel"
 "Hot Rod Alley" (Guy Hemric, Jerry Styner)
 "Wild Ideas" (CD reissue extra track)
 "Wild, Wild Mustang" (CD reissue extra track)

Personnel
Dick Dale – guitar
Glen Campbell – guitar
Gary Usher – vocals
Plas Johnson – sax
Jerry Cole – guitar
Bruce Johnston – keyboards
Earl Palmer – drums

Influence & legacy
The title track was covered by The Smithereens and released as a bonus track on the CD reissue of their debut album, Especially for You.

References

1964 albums
Dick Dale albums
Capitol Records albums